Giselle Galos, commonly known as C. Galos, (sometimes misspelled Galas), was an obscure 19th century Italian or French musician and composer who is responsible for composing two popular pieces of salon music, Le Chant du Berger (Nocturne, Op. 17) and Le Lac de Come (Nocturne, Op. 24). Both pieces are in the form of nocturnes.

Galos' pieces are composed of stock salon clichés and often appear in collections of famous piano pieces.

Galos did not perform in public and her music was typically published under the pseudonym C. Galos. For many years there was debate regarding whether Galos was male or female. Music historians disagreed over what the composer's first name was, with suggestions from Celestino to Charles, based on the "C. Galos" pseudonym. Early publications of Galos' Le Lac de Como have subsequently been discovered under the names "Giselle Galos" and "Madmoiselle Giselle Galos", finally confirming the composer's full name.

External links 
 C. Galos: Le Lac de Côme (Lake Como), 6th Nocturne
 C. Galos: Le Chant du Berger, 3rd Nocturne, Op. 17

References

Year of birth missing
Year of death missing
Women classical composers
French Romantic composers
19th-century women composers
18th-century women composers